The following is a list of female directors who have directed, or are in the process of directing, a television episode based on comics (including comic books, comic strips, manga, and graphic novels). The episodes may be live action, animated, anime, or a combination thereof.

List

A-E

F-J

K-O

P-T

U-Z

See also 
 List of comic-based films directed by women
 List of television series based on Marvel Comics publications
 Marvel Television
 Marvel Animation
 Spider-Man in television
 X-Men in television
 List of television series based on DC Comics publications
 DC animated universe
 Arrowverse
 List of unproduced DC Comics projects
 List of television series and films based on Dark Horse Comics publications
 List of unproduced Dark Horse Comics projects
 List of television series and films based on Harvey Comics publications
 List of television series and films based on Archie Comics publications
 List of television series and films based on Image Comics publications
 List of unproduced Image Comics projects
 List of TV series based on French-language comics
 List of television series based on comic strips

References

External links 
 Movies and Television Episodes Based on Comics Directed by Women on IMDb

Comics publications
Comics
Television programs
 
List
Women television directors